The 2014 Atlantic Sun Conference baseball tournament was held at Swanson Stadium on the campus of Florida Gulf Coast University in Fort Myers, Florida, from May 21 through 25.   won their first tournament championship and claimed the Atlantic Sun Conference's automatic bid to the 2014 NCAA Division I baseball tournament.

Format and seeding
The 2014 tournament was an 8-team double-elimination tournament.  The top eight teams (based on conference results) from the conference earned invites to the tournament.  Northern Kentucky was not eligible for the tournament as it is reclassifying from Division II.

Bracket and results

* - Indicates game required extra innings.

All-Tournament Team
The following players were named to the All=Tournament Team.

Most Valuable Player
Brennan Morgan was named Tournament Most Valuable Player.  Morgan was a sophomore designated hitter for Kennesaw State.  He tallied nine hits and seven RBI for a .642 average over the Owls' four games.

References

ASUN Conference Baseball Tournament
Tournament
Atlantic Sun Conference baseball tournament
Atlantic Sun Conference baseball tournament
College baseball tournaments in Florida
Baseball competitions in Fort Myers, Florida